Spuriopimpinella is a genus of flowering plants belonging to the family Apiaceae.

Its native range is Southern Russian Far East to China and Japan.

Species:

Spuriopimpinella arguta 
Spuriopimpinella brachycarpa 
Spuriopimpinella brachystyla 
Spuriopimpinella calycina 
Spuriopimpinella komarovii 
Spuriopimpinella nikoensis

References

Apiaceae
Apiaceae genera